Salvador Alejandro César Nasralla Salum (born 30 January 1953) is a Honduran sports journalist, television presenter, businessman, and politician who has served as the First Vice President of Honduras since 27 January 2022.  

He is the presenter of the TV programs 5 Deportivo and X-0 da Dinero, and has been called "El señor de la televisión". He was the founder of the Anti-Corruption Party in 2011 and stood for president in the 2013 Honduran general election. He stood again in the 2017 general election for the political alliance Alianza de Oposición contra la Dictadura, comprising Liberty and Refoundation and the Innovation and Unity Party. He narrowly lost to incumbent President Juan Orlando Hernández, despite widespread claims of fraud and irregularities.

Early life
Nasralla was born in Tegucigalpa. His parents, Alejandro Nasralla and Alicia Salum, are Palestinian  and his mother was born in Chile. He spent his childhood in the northern city of Trujillo, Colón. At the age of eleven, his family returned to Tegucigalpa. There, he completed his secondary studies at Instituto San Francisco and obtained his high school diploma. During his adolescence he began working as a journalist, at Emisoras Unidas from 1966 to 1969, and in Uniradio and Radio Católica. He also took classes in drama and television.

After high school, Nasralla was sent to live with his extended family in Chile. There, he attended the Catholic University of Chile where he graduated with honors. He obtained a degree in Civil Industrial Engineering and a Master of Business Administration.

Professional career
After returning from Chile, Nasralla became the CEO of Pepsi Honduras. He also became a professor at the National Autonomous University of Honduras, where he gave lectures on business and engineering.

In 1981, he started his career in television.

Political career

Nasralla has been harshly critical of the Honduran government since the 1980s. In particular, he has pinpointed widespread corruption at the highest levels of government as the main cause of the problems that afflict Honduran society.

With the living standards of many Hondurans deteriorating – perceived as resulting from traditional politicians' indifference or incompetence – Nasralla and others formed the Anti-Corruption Party in 2013. This enabled Nasralla to participate in the 2013 presidential election. He received 418.443 votes, 13.43% of the total.

2017 election

In the 2017 presidential election he represented the left-wing coalition, gaining only slightly fewer votes than the incumbent winner. Despite allegations of widespread irregularities, the United States recognised the reelection of President Juan Orlando Hernandez.

2021 election

Nasralla entered the race for president of Honduras again in 2021, this time as a candidate for the Savior Party. However, he later dropped out and became the running mate of LIBRE party nominee and former first lady Xiomara Castro. They went on to win the election. Nasralla assumed office as First Vice President on 27 January 2022.

2022 Congressional leadership dispute

One condition of Nasralla ending his presidential campaign and endorsing Castro’s was that if they gained a majority in Congress, the congressional president would be a member of the Savior Party. Castro’s Libre party won 50 seats, whilst Nasralla’s Savior party won 10. When the newly elected congress voted for a congressional president on 21 January 2022, 18 deputies from Castro’s party refused to honour the agreement. They voted for Luis Cálix, a member of Libre, rather than Luis Redondo from Nasralla’s party as the Savior members and the rest of the Libre deputies had done. Nasralla commented on the incident as "another coup like in 2009". As a consequence, the 18 deputies were expelled from Libre. The dispute was resolved when Calíx and the expelled Libre deputies agreed to support Redondo. Their membership of Libre was restored when Libre's leader, former President Manuel Zelaya, reversed their expulsion.

Personal life
Nasralla is married to former beauty queen Iroshka Elvir. They have one daughter, born in December, 2017.

References

 

1953 births
Candidates for President of Honduras
Honduran people of Palestinian descent
Honduran politicians
Honduran television journalists
Living people
Male journalists
People from Tegucigalpa
Pontifical Catholic University of Chile alumni
Vice presidents of Honduras